Anthony David Tapia Gil (born 16 January 1987) is a Colombian footballer who plays for Deportivo Pasto. He can play as creative midfielder.

He was a starter on the Colombian Sub 20 that played in the Central American Games in 2006 where Colombia won the Gold Medal. He was surprisingly cut from the team that went on to play the Sudamericana to qualify for the 2007 Sub 20 WC was eliminated in the 2nd round.

External links
 

1987 births
Living people
Sportspeople from Barranquilla
Colombian footballers
Colombian expatriate footballers
Association football midfielders
Deportivo Cali footballers
Atlético Huila footballers
Independiente Santa Fe footballers
Deportivo Pasto footballers
Boyacá Chicó F.C. footballers
Once Caldas footballers
Deportes Copiapó footballers
Categoría Primera A players
Primera B de Chile players
Expatriate footballers in Chile
Colombian expatriate sportspeople in Chile